Charlie Felix Derrington Morgan (born 9 July 1989) is an English sports journalist and former cricketer. Morgan played as a right-handed batsman and fielded as a wicket-keeper.  He was born in Leicester, Leicestershire.

While studying for his degree at Durham University, Morgan made his first-class debut for Durham UCCE against Lancashire in 2008.  He appeared in two further first-class matches for the university in 2009, against Lancashire and Durham.  Two more first-class appearances came in 2010 for the university, by now playing as Durham MCCU following a change of name, against Nottinghamshire and Durham.  In his five first-class matches, he scored 61 runs at an average of 10.16, with a high score of 38.  Behind the stumps, he took 5 catches and made a single stumping.

In a Daily Telegraph article on South Africa's pace bowling, published on 16 August 2022, Morgan commented that the Wikipedia page dedicated to his brief first-class cricket career contained "a vast overestimation of my height".

References

External links
Charlie Morgan at ESPNcricinfo
Charlie Morgan at CricketArchive

1989 births
Living people
Cricketers from Leicester
Alumni of Durham University
English cricketers
Durham MCCU cricketers
Wicket-keepers
People educated at Oakham School